"Somebody Loves You" is a song written by Allen Reynolds, and recorded by American country music artist Crystal Gayle.  It was released in December 1975 as the first single and title track from the album Somebody Loves You.

"Somebody Loves You" was one of two hits produced by Crystal Gayle in 1976. "Somebody Loves You" was followed by the single, "I'll Get Over You". Gayle's voice was still growing when this song was produced, but is still a pieces of work that should be remembered by Gayle.  This single reached number 8 on the country music chart that year. In 1976, Gayle released an album by the same name that featured "Somebody Loves You" in it.

Content
The song talks about a woman that loves someone who lives far away and she explains how she can't get in contact with him.  For example, Gayle sings in one part of the song how she "couldn't reach him by the U.S. Mail".  Then she says "guess who loves, somebody loves you, I do".

Cover versions
The only cover version of note came from Marianne Faithfull, who recorded this for her album Dreamin' My Dreams, in 1977.

Weekly charts

Year-end charts

References

External links
 

1975 singles
1975 songs
Crystal Gayle songs
Songs written by Allen Reynolds
Song recordings produced by Allen Reynolds
United Artists Records singles